The September 1999 Likud leadership election was held on 2 September 1999 to elect the leader of the Likud party. Ariel Sharon was elected to replace outgoing party leader Benjamin Netanyahu.

Background
The leadership election to elect a new Likud leader took place after Israeli Labor Party leader Ehud Barak heavily defeated Likud leader Benjamin Netanyahu in the 1999 Israeli general election.

Candidates
Ehud Olmert, mayor of Jerusalem since 1993
Ariel Sharon, former minister of defense (1981–1983), former minister of energy (1996–1999), former minister of industry and trade (1984–1990), former minister of housing and construction (1990–1993), former Minister of Agriculture and Rural Development (1977–1981), member of the Knesset since 1974, former general
Meir Shitrit, minister of finance since 1998; member of the Knesset (1981–1988, and since 1992)

Electorate
The leadership election was open to the party's general membership, which, at the time, numbered at 143,871. Only roughly one-third of the eligible electorate participated in the vote.

Result
Sharon won the election, becoming the party's new leader and the new leader of the opposition in the Knesset. Due to his advanced age, some saw Sharon as a likely transitional leader, likely to serve only for a short time before stepping aside. But Sharon gave no indication of this being the case.

Spending violation inquiries into Sharon
Sharon would face three official inquiries into potential violations of campaign spending limits in his 1999 leadership campaign.

References

Likud leadership 2
1999 09
Likud
Likud leadership election
1999 09 Likud leadership election
1999 09 Likud leadership election